Biak-na-Bato is a barangay in San Miguel, Bulacan, Philippines. 

Biak-na-Bato may also refer to:

Biak-na-Bato National Park, a protected area in Bulacan, Philippines
Republic of Biak-na-Bato, the first Philippine republic established in Bulacan, Philippines
Pact of Biak-na-Bato, truce between Spanish and Filipino revolutionary forces